James Bridges (February 3, 1936June 6, 1993) was an American screenwriter, film director, producer, and actor. He is a two-time Oscar nominee: once for Best Original Screenplay for The China Syndrome and once for Best Adapted Screenplay for The Paper Chase.

Life and career
Bridges was born February 3, 1936, in Little Rock, Arkansas and grew up in Paris, Arkansas. His mother was Celestine Wiggins, his sister was Mary Ann Wiggins, and his life partner from 1958 until his death was actor, librettist, screenwriter, and producer Jack Larson.  Bridges got his start as a writer for Alfred Hitchcock Presents after catching the attention of Norman Lloyd, a producer for the series. One of his episodes, "An Unlocked Window", earned him a 1966 Edgar Award from the Mystery Writers of America for Best Episode in a TV Series.

Bridges went on to write and direct a number of notable films, including The Baby Maker; The Paper Chase; September 30, 1955; The China Syndrome; Urban Cowboy; Mike's Murder; Perfect; and Bright Lights, Big City.  Bridges was a mentor to actress Debra Winger.

Death
In 1990, Bridges was diagnosed with intestinal cancer. He died of kidney failure  at the UCLA Medical Center on June 6, 1993, at 57 years old. He was buried at Oakwood Cemetery in his hometown of Paris, Arkansas.

The James Bridges Theater at University of California, Los Angeles was named in his honor in November 1999. Bridges was a faculty member there early in his career.

Filmography

References

External links

Edgar Award winners
People from Paris, Arkansas
Writers from Arkansas
LGBT film directors
American LGBT writers
LGBT people from Arkansas
1936 births
1993 deaths
Deaths from kidney failure
Deaths from cancer in California
Film directors from Arkansas
20th-century American LGBT people